Lonjah and the Ogre (Arabic: لونجة والغول) is a novel by Algerian writer Zohour Wanese. It is ranked as one of the 100 best Arabic novels and was chosen by the Book Union that get published in the twenties. Lonjah and the Ogre recalls the values of struggle and the supreme Islamic values, also presents historical, political and social issues, by narrating the events of life and the liberation revolution. The novel used the Algerian folklore.

Summary 
The novel explained the situation of Algeria during the war, and focus more on poor families, and it showed though it the poverty, deprivation, and sadness that most classes were suffering from, in order to make Algeria the second home of France, people were deprived from their freedom and resources. Zhour was able to make the mine character of the novel a symbol of Algeria. “Malekah”, who lived under difficult conditions, and suffers from adversity and lack of independence, until the day came when the anger reached its maximum. Algerian people decided to front of the enemy’s face, rejecting all kinds of harm and humiliation under which they lives, and this is how all the Algerian people were saved.

References 

1993 novels
Algerian novels
Arabic-language novels